'Abd al-Masīḥ Ṣalīb al-Masū'dī (1848–1935) was an Egyptian monk and author.

Biography
'Abd al-Masīḥ Ṣalīb al-Masū'dī was ordained a monk by his uncle, 'Abd al-Masīḥ al-Kabīr, in 1874.

He served at the Paromeos Monastery at Wadi El Natrun and was summoned by Pope Cyril V of Alexandria to assist in the administration of the church in Cairo. 
He learned Hebrew, Syriac, Greek, and Coptic and became a prolific writer. His best known work is his interpretation of the Epact.

He died at the age of eighty-seven.

Works
In addition to his work, above, he wrote:
Kītāb al-Khulaji al-Muqaddas, Cairo, 1903;
Kītāb al-Tuḥfah al-Saniyyah, Cairo, 1925;
Kītāb al-Durrah al-Nafisah fī Ḥisābāt al-Kanīsah, Cairo, 1926;
Al-Tuḥfah al-Barāmūsiyyah fī Sharḥ wa-Tatimmat Qawā'id Hisāb Al-Abqaṭi lil-Kanīsah al-Qibṭiyyah al-Urthudhuksiyyah, Cairo, 1925;
Kītāb al-Karmah, Cairo, 1927;
Kītāb al-Asrār , Cairo, 1926;
Tuḥfat al-Sā'ilīn fī Dhikr Adyirat Ruhbān al-Miṣriyyīnn, Cairo, 1932.

References

1848 births
1935 deaths
Egyptian writers
Oriental Orthodox monks
Egyptian Oriental Orthodox Christians
Egyptian Christian monks
19th-century Christian monks
20th-century Christian monks
19th-century Oriental Orthodox Christians
20th-century Oriental Orthodox Christians
Coptic Orthodox Christians from Egypt